The Drivers United for Mass Progress and Equal Rights – Philippines Taxi Drivers Association (DUMPER PTDA), also known as the DUMPER Partylist is a political organization which has party-list representation in the House of Representatives of the Philippines.

Background
Representing taxi drivers, DUMPER Partylist took part in the 2019 House of Representatives elections winning a single seat, which was filled in by Claudine Bautista, daughter of Davao Occidental Governor Claude Bautista. Bautista as DUMPER's representative advocated for the Magna Carta for Public Transportation Drivers Bill to become law which would institutionalize insurance and subsidies for drivers in the public transport sector. It took part again in the 2022 elections in a bid to at least retain its lone seat.

The organization is also involved in sports being one of the sponsors of the Pilipinas Super League. The Davao Occidental Tigers is also associated with the partylist.

References

Party-lists represented in the House of Representatives of the Philippines